Susan Huehnergard is a Canadian former pairs figure skater with partner and brother Paul Huehnergard. She is the 1965 and 1966 national champion.

Results
(with Huehnergard)

References

skatabase

Canadian female pair skaters
Living people
Year of birth missing (living people)